National Population Commission (राष्ट्रीय जनसंख्या आयोग) is a commission of the Indian government.

It was established in 11 May 2000. It is chaired by the prime minister with the Deputy Chairman Planning Commission (now NITI Aayog) as vice chairman. Chief ministers of all states, ministers of the related central ministries, secretaries of the concerned departments, eminent physicians, demographers and the representatives of the civil society are members of the commission.

But presently this Commission is functioning under Ministry of Health.

Mandate
The commission has the mandate 
to review, monitor and give direction for implementation of the National Population Policy with the view to achieve the goals set in the Population Policy
promote synergy between health, educational environmental and developmental programmes so as to hasten population stabilization 
promote inter sectoral coordination in planning and implementation of the programmes through different sectors and agencies in center and the states
develop a vigorous peoples programme to support this national effort.

See also
 Demographics of India
 Politics of India
 Human overpopulation

Notes and references

External links
Population Commission site

Government agencies of India
Population concern organizations
Population organizations
Censuses in India
2000 establishments in India
Government agencies established in 2000